Excoecaria confertiflora is a species of flowering plant in the family Euphorbiaceae. It was described in 1978. It is native to Fiji.

References

confertiflora
Plants described in 1978
Flora of Fiji